Reedy Rill is a historic plantation house located near Warrenton, Warren County, North Carolina.  The main house was built between 1830 and 1846, and remodeled about 1855 and credited to Warrenton builder Jacob W. Holt.  It is a two-story, square, Italianate style frame dwelling. It features simple pilasters terminating in heavy brackets and round arched windows. It has a front porch, stuccoed foundation, and rear shed addition.  Reedy Rill was built for Congressman Daniel Turner.

It was listed on the National Register of Historic Places in 1974.

References 

Plantation houses in North Carolina
Houses on the National Register of Historic Places in North Carolina
Italianate architecture in North Carolina
Houses completed in 1855
Houses in Warren County, North Carolina
National Register of Historic Places in Warren County, North Carolina